The Transmutation of Ike Garuda is a two-issue prestige format mini-series published by the Epic Comics imprint of Marvel Comics, with the first issue being released in 1991 and the second issue in 1992. It was written by Elaine Lee, with art by James Sherman.

Like some of Elaine Lee's other work, The Transmutation of Ike Garuda is science fiction of the noir space opera genre.

Setting
The Transmutation of Ike Garuda is set in a future in which interstellar spaceflight transportation has been obsoleted by the Galactic Access System (abbreviated G.A.S.), an interstellar transportation system that uses teleportation devices called wombs that function in a way similar to the transporters of Star Trek. Wombs are not entirely reliable: luggage is frequently lost, and, less commonly, people are lost as well (it is also implied that the Tranzit Authority may deliberately "lose" its enemies, thereby assassinating them). Furthermore, a few planets, like New Saxon, are off-line, meaning that, for unknown (at least, at the beginning of the story) reasons, they cannot be reached by G.A.S.

The universe is dominated by four organizations:

 the G.A.S. Tranzit Authority (abbreviated T.A.), the most powerful megacorp in the universe due to its monopoly over G.A.S.
 Diamond Minds (abbreviated D.M.), a smaller megacorp, rival to the Tranzit Authority; it specializes in mind-related technologies and controls a planet also known as Diamond Minds
 Cybertronics Systems (abbreviated Cy-Systems), a megacorp specializing in cyberware and organ growing
 Hermeeze Elite (abbreviated Hermeeze or Elite), a very reliable courier service whose Grade A couriers may be trusted to safeguard the messages they carry with their lives

Some terms are different from modern-day usage. Computers are known as brain-banks, or more simply, as brains or banks. The calendar uses, instead of years, periods of time known as kics or kiks (the spelling differs through the comic).

Plot synopsis
Private detective Ike Garuda is called in by Diamond Minds, ostensibly to investigate the theft of a prototype of one of its experimental technologies, a sending platform or soloflight transport device. As Garuda investigates, he learns that rather than being involved in a simple industrial espionage case, he is actually caught up in a deeper and much more complex conspiracy that threatens to upset the balance of power in the universe.

Characters
Characters, in order of their appearance or mention in The Transmutation of Ike Garuda, with descriptions of whom they apparently are when they are first introduced (by the end of the story, many of the characters are revealed to be something other than what they initially seemed):

 Ike Garuda, the protagonist, a private detective who has had some of his memories artificially erased against his will
 Frankie Pongo, a Grade B (second-rate) courier sent by Jim Diamond to meet Garuda when Garuda arrives on Diamond Minds
 Jim Diamond, owner of Diamond Minds, who hires Garuda
 Lark Diamond, daughter of Jim Diamond and manager of Diamond Minds, who deals with Garuda on her father's behalf
 Barry Reasoner, a stuttering engineer who witnessed the robbery of the sending platform
 Billy Argent, head of Cybertronics Systems, dying of a degenerative disease
 an unnamed Ontean, an alien from the off-line planet Onté who desperately wants to return home, working as a supervisor for the Tranzit Authority
 Maera Lethe, a Tranzit Authority agent and interrogator-through-torture who has history with Garuda
 Lark Too, a biodroid copy of Lark Diamond
 Lirren Vyne, owner of the pleasure planet Vyne's World, a member of the three-sexed Rhodbydysawd
 Eddie Argent, nephew and representative of Billy Argent
 Director Paloma, a representative of the Tranzit Authority
 Xavier Swann, head of Hermeeze Elite, living on his generation spaceship (or gen ship, for short) Swannsong
 Lekbah, a Grade A Hermeeze Elite courier working for Xavier Swann
 Boote, Xavier Swann's guard, born in and adapted for low-gravity environments
 Jerry Diamond, Jim Diamond's cousin

Themes
The Transmutation of Ike Garuda explores a number of science fiction existential themes and asks bioethical questions, such as whether a person who enters a womb has the same identity as the same person reconstituted in a womb on another planet, and whether biodroid copies are just as real as the people on whom they are based.

See also
 Starstruck

References

 The Transmutation of Ike Garuda at the Big Comic Book DataBase

External links
 The Transmutation of Ike Garuda on Atomic Avenue